Roger Gill (May 23, 1972 – March 2, 2008) was a Guyanese Olympic sprinter who competed in the 1996 Summer Olympics. Born to mother Margaret White, and father Richard Gill. Gill ran a leg in the 4x400-meter relay, Guyana finished sixth out of seven teams and failed to qualify past the first round.

Gill was a graduate of Stony Brook University, where he still holds the school outdoor records in the 100- and 200-meters as well as holding the marks indoors at 200- and 400-meters.

Gill married Annette Hicks in 1997 and had six children.

Gill was killed in a car crash on March 2, 2008, in Brooklyn, New York, when the car he was riding in hit a box truck; the driver also died.

References

External links
Roger Gill's profile at Sports Reference.com

1972 births
2008 deaths
Guyanese male sprinters
Road incident deaths in New York City
Athletes (track and field) at the 1996 Summer Olympics
Olympic athletes of Guyana
Stony Brook University alumni
Guyanese emigrants to the United States
20th-century Guyanese people
21st-century Guyanese people